Mohamad Shahrul Nizam bin Ros Hasni (born 25 May 1998) is a Malaysian professional footballer who plays for Malaysia Super League club Terengganu as a centre-back.

Club career

Terengganu
On 9 November 2020, Shahrul Nizam signed a two-year contract with Terengganu.

International career
Sharul Nizam represented the Malaysian national team at the 2019 Southeast Asian Games.

Shahrul Nizam also represented Malaysia at 2019 AFF U-22 Youth Championship.

Career statistics

Club

Honours

Terengganu
 Malaysia Super League runner-up: 2022

References

External links
 

Living people
1998 births
People from Kelantan
Malaysian people of Malay descent
Malaysian footballers
Kelantan FA players
Terengganu FC players
Association football central defenders
Malaysia Super League players
Competitors at the 2019 Southeast Asian Games
Malaysia youth international footballers
Southeast Asian Games competitors for Malaysia